Lansing Eastern High School is a public, magnet high school in Lansing, Michigan as part of the Lansing School District. Eastern International Baccalaureate Magnet High School is the only high school in mid-Michigan authorized to offer students the opportunity to earn an International Baccalaureate Diploma. Eastern also has the second-largest alumni association in the United States. It was located on the city's east-side on Pennsylvania Avenue, one block north of Michigan Avenue but is now located on Marshall Street on the corner of Marshall Street and Saginaw Street. The building was connected with former Pattengill Middle School next to Sparrow Hospital. In 2007, Sparrow purchased the Pattengill property to create a parking lot.  With the deconstruction of Pattengill Middle School, Lansing Eastern became the oldest operational school in the Lansing School District. It opened in 1928 as the second high school in the city. The athletic teams were named Quakers because the school was located on Pennsylvania Avenue and a Society of Friends (Quaker) meeting house was located across the street. In March 2012 the Lansing School District announced that Eastern would house 7-12 grades beginning in the 2012–2013 school year. On January 20, 2016, the Lansing School Board voted to sell the school to the Edward Sparrow Hospital Association for approximately $2.5 million. Students were relocated to the former Pattengill Middle School in Fall 2019.

Athletics 

Eastern's sports teams are known as the Quakers and are members of the Capital Area Activities Conference, with intracity rivals Everett High School and Sexton High School.  The school adopted the Quaker as its mascot because the school was located on Pennsylvania Avenue and the Quakers settled in Pennsylvania State.

Until 1975, most of Eastern's indoor sports activities took place in the school gymnasium, which seated approximately 600 spectators and was unable to accommodate a full-sized basketball court. In the 1975–76 school year, the Lansing School District acquired and renovated the 4,200-seat field house at the adjacent Boys' Training School, then being closed by the State of Michigan. The field house was renamed in 1982 after longtime LEHS (Lansing Eastern High School) teacher and wrestling coach Don Johnson.

Outdoor sports such as track and football were played for many years at a field located between the Eastern and Pattengill school buildings. However this field had limited seating capacity which made it inadequate for varsity football games. In the late 1950s, after the construction of the 4,000-seat Memorial Stadium at Lansing Sexton, the two schools shared the home field until 2020.

In 2020, in conjunction with the construction of the new Eastern High School complex on Marshall Street, a new football/track facility was built on Pennsylvania Avenue adjacent to the Don Johnson Field House, baseball and softball fields and tennis courts. The new football stadium features an artificial surface and seating for approximately 2,500.

Academics 
Eastern High School is known for its International Baccalaureate Diploma Program, the only school in the area to have such a program.  Post Oak Academy, one of its feeder schools, houses the International Baccalaureate Primary Years Program and Chinese Immersion Program.  Additionally, Eastern is known for drop-out rates in excess of 40%.

Notable alumni
Kevin Jackson, Olympic Gold Medalist in freestyle wrestling, former head wrestling coach at Iowa State University
Kelly Miller, former NHL player
Kevin Miller, former NHL player
Kip Miller, former NHL player
Jay Vincent, former NBA player
Sam Vincent, former NBA player and head coach

References

External links
 Eastern High School Home Page
 IB Web Site

Education in Lansing, Michigan
Public high schools in Michigan
Educational institutions established in 1928
Schools in Ingham County, Michigan
Magnet schools in Michigan
1928 establishments in Michigan